Joseph Michael Prokop (January 9, 1921 – April 29, 1995) was an American football halfback who played one season with the Chicago Rockets of the All-America Football Conference. He first enrolled at the University of Notre Dame before transferring to Bradley University. He attended Cathedral Latin High School in Cleveland, Ohio.

Professional career
Prokop played in two games for the Chicago Rockets during the 1948 season.

Personal life
Prokop's brother Eddie also played in the AAFC.

References

External links
Just Sports Stats

1921 births
1995 deaths
Players of American football from Cleveland
American football halfbacks
Notre Dame Fighting Irish football players
Bradley Braves football players
Chicago Rockets players